The  Pittsburgh Power season was the second season for the franchise in the Arena Football League. The team played their home games at Consol Energy Center. After a 2–8 start, head coach Chris Siegfried was fired and replaced by defensive coordinator Derek Stingley. The Power finished the season 5–13 and did not qualify for the playoffs.

Standings

Schedule
The Power began the season on the road against the Orlando Predators on March 9. Their home opener was on March 23 against the Philadelphia Soul. They hosted the Jacksonville Sharks on July 20 in their final regular season game.

 Gray indicates that the game was played during a labor dispute. On March 9 against Orlando, some replacement players were used and the game went on as scheduled.
 Due to a players' strike within the Cleveland Gladiators, the Gladiators were unable to field enough players, and forfeited the game.

Final roster

References

Pittsburgh Power
Pittsburgh Power seasons
Pittsburgh Power